The Allenby Street bus bombing was a suicide bombing that occurred on September 19, 2002 on a Dan bus in the center of Tel Aviv's business district. Six people were killed in the attack and approximately 70 were injured. Hamas claimed responsibility for the attack.

The attack
Shortly before 13:00 on Thursday, 19 September 2002, a Palestinian suicide bomber blew himself up at the front part of a crowded bus in the heart Tel Aviv's business district. The attack was carried out on Dan commuter bus No. 4 as the bus was passing through Allenby Street in front of the Great Synagogue of Tel Aviv. Six people were killed and approximately 70 were injured in the attack.

The Palestinian Islamist militant organization Hamas claimed responsibility for the attack.

Aftermath

Israeli retaliation 
The Israeli government accused Yasser Arafat and the Palestinian leadership of involvement in the Second Intifada militancy campaign and in illegal arms trafficking. After an emergency meeting of the security cabinet, convened in wake of the bombing, Israel launched a military operation in the West Bank in which tanks and armored vehicles began a siege on the compound of Yasser Arafat in Ramallah. Arafat was besieged in the Mukataa compound for close to two years until his departure to a hospital in Paris in October 2004. Much of the Mukataa was destroyed by the IDF in the course of the siege.

Organ donation 
Among the victims was Yoni Jesner, a Jewish teenager who attended Har Etzion yeshiva in Gush Etzion. Jesner sustained a critical head injury, and his parents signed their consent to detaching him from life support and donating his organs. Yasmin Abu Ramila, a 7-year old  Palestinian girl from East Jerusalem, was the recipient of his kidney. The surgery was successful and Yasmin reportedly has a very good chance of living a normal life. The story was widely reported due to the circumstances and Jesner's organ being donated to a child on the opposite side of the conflict.

Official reactions
Involved parties
: Israeli officials stated that the attack indicated that the Palestinian leadership was still unable or unwilling to rein in militants attacking Israeli targets.

:
Palestinian National Authority - PNA officials condemned the attack and asked all Palestinian groups to denounce it.
 Hamas spokesman Ismail Abu Shanab stated that he expected to see "a series of operations against the Zionist enemy, as a result of the daily brutal crimes against our people."

 Supranational
 – EU officials called on Israel to show restraint, suggesting that a harsh Israeli reprisal for the terrorist attack in Tel Aviv, which was claimed by Arafat's opponents, would ruin efforts made to reform the Palestinian National Authority and to secure a ceasefire between the parties.

 International
 – At a meeting in the Oval Office US President George Bush strongly condemned the attack and stated that "All parties must do everything they can to reject and stop violence"

See also
Yoni Jesner and Ahmed Khatib

References

External links 
 Six killed, scores wounded in suicide attack on Tel Aviv bus - published on USA Today on September 19, 2002
 Tel Aviv bus bomb shatters hopes of truce - published on The Guardian on September 20, 2002
 Fatal bus blast rocks Tel Aviv - published on BBC News on September 19, 2002
 Suicide Bomber Kills 5 on a Bus in Tel Aviv - published on The New York Times on September 20, 2002
 Heart of Tel Aviv hit - published on CNN on September 19, 2002

Attacks in Asia in 2002
Mass murder in 2002
Suicide bombings in 2002
Hamas suicide bombings of buses
Terrorist incidents in Israel in 2002
Terrorist incidents in Tel Aviv
2000s in Tel Aviv
September 2002 events in Asia
Islamic terrorism in Israel